Kuvshinovka, rural localities in Russia, may refer to:

 Kuvshinovka, Kursk Oblast, a village
 Kuvshinovka, Ulyanovsk Oblast, a village

 Also
 Kuvshinovka (river), a tributary of Oklan in the basin of the Penzhina

 See also
 Kuvshinovo